This article lists notable mountains in the U.S. state of Georgia.

Highest mountains
The following sortable table lists the 11 highest mountain peaks of Georgia with at least  of topographic prominence. The eleven highest mountains in Georgia are all located in five counties in northeast Georgia.  Some of these mountains have true summits or peaks, while others are high points on a ridge.  Listings found elsewhere may not necessarily agree because they do not include each of these mountains.

Other Blue Ridge mountains

Big Bald Mountain
Black Mountain (Georgia)
Black Rock Mountain
Big John Dick Mountain
Cowrock Mountain
Flat Top (Georgia mountain)
Fort Mountain (Murray County, Georgia)
Glade Mountain
Glassy Mountain
Grassy Mountain
Horsetrough Mountain
Jacks Knob
Levelland Mountain
Mount Oglethorpe
Rich Knob
Rich Mountain (Georgia)
Rock Mountain (Georgia)
Rocky Mountain (Georgia)
Rocky Knob (Georgia)
Screamer Mountain
Springer Mountain
Three Sisters (Georgia)
Wildcat Mountain (Georgia)
Yonah Mountain
Young Lick

Ridge-and-Valley

Baugh Mountain
Johns Mountain
Lookout Mountain
Pigeon Mountain
Snodgrass Hill
Taylor Ridge (Georgia)

Other mountains

Alcovy Mountain
Arabia Mountain
Bear Mountain (Georgia)
Blackjack Mountain (Carroll County, Georgia)
Chenocetah Mountain
Currahee Mountain
Dowdell's Knob
Kennesaw Mountain
Little Kennesaw Mountain
Panola Mountain
Pine Log Mountain
Pine Mountain (Bartow County, Georgia)
Pine Mountain (Cobb County, Georgia)
Sawnee Mountain
Six Flags Hill
Stone Mountain
Sweat Mountain
Wauka Mountain
Mount Wilkinson

See also
List of mountains in the United States

References

Georgia Above 4000

Georgia
Georgia

Mountains